Tifosi is a group of supporters of a sports team, especially those that make up a tifo.

Etymology
It is erroneously claimed that "In Italian,  literally means those infected by typhus disease, a reference to someone acting in a fevered manner." In reality, it comes from Ancient Greek "typhos," meaning smoke, as it was customary for spectators of the Ancient Olympic Games to celebrate the victories of their favourite athletes by reuniting around a bonfire.  The confusion is due to the fact that both fever and smoke share the same etymological root, "typhos."

Tifosi is used for a mixed gender or an all-male group; masculine singular is tifoso, feminine singular tifosa, feminine plural tifose.

Football
The word is mainly used to describe fans of clubs in football. Apart from the many local fan clubs in Italy, whose main role is, for example, to provide a meeting place for fans and friends and organize away trips, since the late 1960s, many Italian fans rely on organized stadium groups known as Ultras. The main goal is to choreograph fan support with flags, banners, coloured smoke screens, flares, drums, and chanting in unison. For most teams city rivalries, colours, coat of arms, symbols, and the overall iconography have roots in the Middle Ages and early Renaissance.

Formula One

It has become common to use the word Tifosi to refer to the supporters of Scuderia Ferrari in Formula One. Italian motor racing fans are well known for their love of Ferrari, though they have also been staunch supporters of other Italian cars such as Maserati, Lancia and Alfa Romeo.

The Tifosi provide Formula One with a sea of red filling the grandstands at the Italian Grand Prix. One of the most common Tifosi sights is the display of an enormous Ferrari flag in the grandstands during Formula One weekends at every race circuit, with especially large contingents showing up in Ferrari livery at home and nearby European tracks. A similar sight could be observed in former years during the San Marino race, which was held at the Autodromo Enzo e Dino Ferrari near the town of Imola, 80 km (49.7 mi) east of the Ferrari factory in Maranello.

It has not been uncommon for the Tifosi in Italy to actually cheer for a non-Italian driver in a Ferrari passing an Italian driver in another make of car for the lead of a race. At the 1983 San Marino Grand Prix, the crowd at Imola cheered long and loud when Italian Riccardo Patrese crashed his Brabham out of the lead of the race only 6 laps from home, handing Frenchman Patrick Tambay the win in his Ferrari. Patrese himself had only passed Tambay for the lead half a lap earlier.

One driver who never actually drove for Ferrari but is supported by the Tifosi is Frenchman Jean-Louis Schlesser. He drove for the Williams team at the 1988 Italian Grand Prix at Monza substituting for an ill Nigel Mansell. On lap 49 of the 51 lap race, Schlesser was unwittingly involved in the incident at the Variante del Rettifilo chicane that took out the leading McLaren-Honda of Ayrton Senna, fittingly handing Ferrari's Gerhard Berger and Michele Alboreto an emotional 1–2 Italian Grand Prix result only a month after the death of Enzo Ferrari. Berger's win handed McLaren their only loss of the 16-race  season.

The Tifosi stuck by Ferrari during the struggles in the early 1990s, where Gerhard Berger and Jean Alesi each won one race, as the front-running teams were McLaren, Williams, and Benneton. The mid-1990s increase in the ranks of the Tifosi can be directly traced to the arrival of Michael Schumacher who joined Ferrari in 1996, after winning two drivers' titles with Benneton, bringing over key personnel like Ross Brawn and Rory Byrne. Schumacher drove for Ferrari until his first retirement at the conclusion of the 2006 season, leading the team to six Constructors' Championship from 1999–2004 and personally winning five drivers' championships.

When Ferrari's Charles Leclerc won at Monza 2019, which was the first time for the team since 2010, a massive crowd of Tifosi went to the podium to celebrate the victory. As revealed by David Croft during the podium celebration, there is a love-hate relationship between the Tifosi and Mercedes, who have won in Monza from the start of the turbo hybrid era in 2014 to 2018. Whenever a Mercedes wins the Italian GP, or makes the podium, the Tifosi would boo at the driver.

Cycling
The word is commonly used to describe fans along the roadside at professional road cycling races in Italy such as Tirreno–Adriatico, Milan–San Remo, the Giro d'Italia, and the Giro di Lombardia.

Passionate supporters of Italian cycling teams and cyclists are called 'the tifosi'.

See also
 Curva
 Ultras
 Oranjegekte, Dutch counterpart

References

Association football supporters
Football in Italy
Sports spectators
Cycle racing in Italy
Ferrari
Formula One
Italian words and phrases